Sputnix (also , "Satellite Innovative Space Systems") is a privatelyowned satellite construction company headquartered at the Skolkovo Innovation Center. It is one of Russia's first private space companies. It was founded in 2011 by ScanEx.

History 
Sputnix was established in 2011 by the ScanEx satellite technology department, which developed the orientation and stabilization system of the Chibis-M microsatellite by order of  the Russian Space Research Institute. It is based at the Skolkovo Innovation Center.

Since 2012, Sputnix has been creating satellite platforms and service systems for microsatellites and nanosatellites. In 2013, Sputnix received a license from the Russian Federal Space Agency to carry out space activities and began to create a microsatellite-technology demonstrator TabletSat-Aurora.

On June 19, 2014, the first privately-owned Russian microsatellite, Tabletsat-Aurora, was launched into a Low Earth orbit on a Ukrainian launch vehicle Dnepr rocket implementing a contract between Sputnix and ISC Kosmotras. In 2017, Sputnix developed the Orbiсraft-Pro satellite platform based on the international CubeSat standard. The OrbiСraft-Pro platform is a design kit that allows the assembly of various configurations of nanosatellites with different payloads. The scientific and educational satellites SiriusSat-1 (COSPAR 1998-067PG; decayed from orbit 9 December 2020) and SiriusSat-2 (COSPAR 1998-067PH; decayed from orbit 9 December 2020) were created with the OrbiСraft-Pro platform, and launched from the International Space Station on August 15, 2018.

Main activities 
Sputnix develops orientation and stabilization systems and other service systems for microsatellites and CubeSat satellites; microsatellite and CubeSat platforms, allowing the quick creation of satellites for technological, scientific and educational experiments; equipment and software for ground communication stations; attitude determination and control system (ADCS) test benches for research of small satellites dynamics in the simulated space environment of zero gravity, homogenous unsteady magnetic field, sunlight, sky of stars; and equipment for aerospace education.

International activity 
Sputnix is known as an experienced producer and exporter in the space field. The company provides solutions for educational aerospace laboratories and aerospace education for schools and universities. Sputnix delivers satellite functional kits, data receiving ground stations, space environment simulators and equipment, accompanied by educational materials.

Satellites

References 

Space industry companies of Russia
Commercial launch service providers
Manufacturing companies based in Moscow
Aerospace companies of Russia